The Mindaugas Bridge is a bridge in Vilnius, Lithuania. It crosses Neris River and connects Žirmūnai elderate with the Old Town of Vilnius. The bridge was named after Mindaugas, King of Lithuania, and was opened in 2003 during the celebrations of the 750th anniversary of Mindaugas' coronation.

Gallery

References 

Bridges completed in 2003
Road bridges in Lithuania
Bridges in Vilnius